Len Cabral is an American storyteller who was awarded the Circle of Excellence in 2001 by the National Storytelling Network after being recognized by his peers as a master storyteller.

Biography 
Cabral, whose grandparents came from Cape Verde, was born in North Providence, Rhode Island, on 24 April 1948. In the early 1970s, he worked in a day care center, where he realised the power of storytelling to entertain children and to teach them how to listen and communicate. In 1976, he began traveling to tell stories to school children, adults and senior citizens, firstly within New England, and then across the US. He tells traditional folk tales from Cape Verde, Native America, the Caribbean, and other places around the world, as well yarns from his own life. Among his stories are tales of Anansi, Tubino and Nho Lobo, Coyote and Old Man Winter  and other 'how and why' tales.
He is well known for his enthusiastic hand gestures and character voices. He performs at storytelling festivals across the country and internationally, and is a regular performer at the National Storytelling Festival.

Selected works 
 1996 - Stories for the Wee Folk (audiocassette / CD)
 1996 - It's How You Say It (audiocassette / CD)
 1997 - Len Cabral's Storytelling Book

Awards 
Parents' Choice Silver Honor award for It's How You Say It
National Storytelling Network Circle of Excellence, 2001

See also
Storytelling
Storytelling festival

References

External links
Official website

Living people
1950 births
American storytellers
Artists from Rhode Island

American people of Cape Verdean descent